La Mare de Carteret High School is a high school on the island of Guernsey in the Channel Islands, located in the Castel parish.

In February 2016, the school received a validation report from Education Scotland where it was rated as "Very Good" in all but one quality indicator.

Significantly, this report highlighted the school as an example of "transformational change" and referred to outstanding leadership as a key driver of its success.

History

Amalgamation with St. Peter Port Secondary School (2009-)
When the new academic year started in September 2009, the last remaining students of St. Peter Port Secondary school started Key Stage 4 at La Mare de Carteret High School. Joining them was the previous Head Master of St. Peter Port Secondary School, who took the place of the former Head Master of La Mare de Carteret High School, Mr. Phillip White.

In February 2012, Mr. Ken Wheeler retired from his position as Head Teacher. Mr. Geoff Cowley who initially was brought in as School Improvement Adviser became Interim Headmaster. From April 2012 the Headteacher of the school has been Mrs. Vicky Godley who has presided over the school moving from "Under-developed" to "Very Good" in less than 4 years.

Transformational change (2016)
The most recent La Mare de Carteret High School validation found the following key strengths:
 The leadership of the headteacher, senior leadership team and majority of middle leaders
 The quality of teaching and learning in most subjects
 Staffs’ use of progress and attainment data to focus on and improve the performance in each subject
 The school’s inclusive ethos and the support provided by staff and partners to help students with special educational needs
 The steps taken by the school to improve the engagement of parents in their children’s education
 The high levels of participation of the motivated students in the school’s extensive programme of enrichment activities

Pathways
Students from La Mare de Carteret can choose to continue learning at the Guernsey College of Further Education or the Sixth Form Centre when they leave school. The school also provides curriculum entitlement for careers so supports learners to move onto apprenticeships and the world of work dependent on their personal pathway.

Notable alumni
 Matt Le Tissier (Southampton F.C. and England footballer; television pundit).

References

Schools in Guernsey
Secondary schools in the Channel Islands